The 1992 Paris–Tours was the 86th edition of the Paris–Tours cycle race and was held on 10 October 1992. The race started in Issy-les-Moulineaux and finished in Tours. The race was won by Hendrik Redant of the Lotto team.

General classification

References

1992 in French sport
1992
1992 UCI Road World Cup
October 1992 sports events in Europe
1992 in road cycling